Belopus elongatus (synonym Centorus (Belopus) elongatus Herbst, 1797) is a species of darkling beetles in the subfamily Lagriinae.

Subspecies
There are two subspecies:
Belopus elongatus elongatus (Herbst, 1797)
Belopus elongatus ecalcaratus (Seidlitz, 1896)

Distribution
This species can be found in the Canary Islands, Madeira, Malta, Sardinia, and Sicily, and possibly the Italian mainland.

References

External links

 Beetles

Lagriinae
Beetles of Europe
Insects of the Canary Islands
Arthropods of Madeira
Beetles described in 1797
Taxa named by Johann Friedrich Wilhelm Herbst